Australia competed at the 1984 Summer Olympics in Los Angeles, United States.  Australian athletes have competed in every Summer Olympic Games. 242 competitors, 169 men and 73 women, took part in 137 events in 22 sports.

Medalists

Archery

In the fourth Olympic archery competition that Australia contested, the nation sent one woman and one man. Two-time veteran Terene Donovan improved her score from four years earlier by 99 points even as she fell ten places in the ranking.

Women's Individual Competition
Terene Donovan — 2442 points (→ 19th place)

Men's Individual Competition
Christopher Blake — 2434 points (→ 31st place)

Athletics

Men's 100 metres
Peter Van Miltenburg
 Qualifying Heat — 10.55
 Quarterfinals — 10.52 (→ did not advance)

Men's 200 metres
Peter Van Miltenburg
 Qualifying Heat — 21.06
 Quarterfinals — 21.09 (→ did not advance)

Men's 400 metres 
 Darren Clark
 Heat — 45.68
 Quarterfinals — 44.77
 Semifinals — 45.26
 Final — 44.75 (→ 4th place)
 Bruce Frayne
 Heat — 46.08
 Quarterfinals — 45.35
 Semifinals — 45.21 (→ did not advance)
Gary Minihan
 Heat — 46.93 (→ did not advance)

Men's Marathon
 Robert de Castella — 2:11:09 (→ 5th place)

Men's Long Jump
 Gary Honey
 Qualification — 7.93m
 Final — 8.24m (→  Silver Medal)

Men's High Jump
 John Atkinson
 Qualification — 2.21m (→ did not advance)

Men's Decathlon 
 Peter Hadfield
 Final result — 7683 points (→ 14th place)

Men's 20 km Walk
 David Smith
 Final — 1:26:48 (→ 10th place)
 Simon Baker
 Final — 1:27:43 (→ 14th place)
 Willi Sawall
 Final — 1:28:24 (→ 16th place)

Men's 50 km Walk
 Michael Harvey
 Final — 4:09:18 (→ 11th place)
 Andrew Jachno
 Final — DNF (→ no ranking)
 Willi Sawall
 Final — DNF (→ no ranking)

Women's 3,000 metres 
 Donna Gould
 Heat — 9.05.56 (→ did not advance)

Women's Marathon 
 Lisa Martin
 Final — 2:29.03 (→ 7th place)

Women's 400m Hurdles 
 Debbie Flintoff-King
 Heat — 57.20
 Semifinal — 56.24
 Final — 56.21 (→ 6th place)

Women's Long Jump
Robyn Lorraway
 Qualification — 6.61 m
 Final — 6.67 m (→ 6th place)
Glynis Nunn
 Qualification — 6.41 m
 Final — 6.53 m (→ 7th place)
Linda Garden
 Qualification — 6.49 m
 Final — 6.30 m (→ 11th place)

Women's High Jump 
 Vanessa Browne
 Qualification — 1.90m
 Final — 1.94m (→ 6th place)
 Christine Stanton
 Qualification — 1.90m
 Final — 1.85m (→ 11th place)

Women's Discus Throw 
 Gael Martin
 Qualification — 55.38m
 Final — 55.88m (→ 8th place)

Women's Javelin Throw 
 Petra Rivers
 Qualification — 59.12m
 Final — 56.20m (→ 12th place)

Women's Shot Put
 Gael Martin
 Final — 19.19 m (→  Bronze Medal)

Women's Heptathlon
 Glynis Nunn
 Final result — 6390 points (→  Gold Medal)

Basketball

Men's team competition
Preliminary round (Group A)
 Defeated Brazil (76–72)
 Lost to Yugoslavia (64–94)
 Defeated West-Germany (67–66)
 Lost to Italy (82–93)
 Defeated Egypt (94–78)
Quarterfinals
 Lost to Spain (93–101)
Classification Matches
 5th/8th place: Lost to Uruguay (95–101)
 7th/8th place: Defeated West-Germany (83–76) → Seventh place
Team Roster
Phil Smyth (captain)
Andrew Campbell
Damian Keogh
Larry Sengstock
Mark Dalton
Wayne Carroll
Mel Dalgleish
Andrew Gaze
Ian Davies
Danny Morseau
Brad Dalton
Ray Borner
Head coach: Lindsay Gaze

Women's team competition
Preliminary round
Lost to PR China (64–67)
Lost to United States (47–81)
Lost to Canada (45–56)
Lost to South Korea (48–54)
Defeated Yugoslavia (62–59) → Fifth place
Team Roster
Robyn Maher
Bronwyn Marshall
Jenny Cheesman (captain)
Patricia Cockrem
Donna Quinn
Patricia Mickan
Julie Nykiel
Kathryn Foster
Marina Moffa
Karen Dalton
Wendy Laidlaw
Sue Geh

Head Coach: Brendan Flynn

Boxing

Men's Flyweight (– 51 kg)
 Jeff Fenech
 First round — Defeated René Centellas (BOL), RSC-3
 Second round — Defeated David Mwaba (TNZ), 5:0
 Quarterfinals — Lost to Redzep Redzepovski (YUG), 1:4

Canoeing

Cycling

Twelve cyclists represented Australia in 1984, winning gold in the team pursuit.

Individual road race
 Jeff Leslie – +22:20 (→ 50th place)
 Michael Lynch – +27:05 (→ 55th place)
 Gary Trowell – did not finish (→ no ranking)
 John Watters – did not finish (→ no ranking)

Team time trial
 Jeff Leslie
 Michael Lynch
 Gary Trowell
 John Watters

Sprint
 Kenrick Tucker
 Max Rainsford

1000m time trial
 Max Rainsford

Individual pursuit
 Dean Woods
 Michael Grenda

Team pursuit
 Michael Grenda
 Kevin Nichols
 Michael Turtur
 Dean Woods

Points race
 Glenn Clarke
 Gary West

Diving

Men's 3m Springboard
Steve Foley
 Preliminary round — 543.87
 Final — 561.93 (→ 8th place)

Equestrianism

Fencing

Three fencers, one man and two women, represented Australia in 1984.

Men's foil
 Greg Benko

Women's foil
 Helen Smith
 Andrea Chaplin

Gymnastics

Hockey

Men's team competition
Preliminary round (Group A)
 Australia — Malaysia 5–0
 Australia — Spain 3–1
 Australia — West Germany 3–0
 Australia — India 4–2
 Australia — USA 2–1
Semi-finals
 Australia — Pakistan 0–1
Bronze Medal Game
 Australia — Great Britain 2–3 (→ Fourth Place)
Team Roster
 Ric Charlesworth
 David Bell
 Jim Irvine
 Terry Walsh
 Trevor Smith
 Grant Boyce
 Nigel Patmore
 Neil Snowden
 Treva King
 Grant Mitton
 Peter Haselhurst
 Adrian Berce
 Craig Davies
 Colin Batch
 Michael Nobbs
 Terry Leece

Women's team competition
Round Robin
 Australia — West Germany 2–2
 Australia — New Zealand 3–0
 Australia — Canada 1–2
 Australia — USA 3–1
 Australia — Netherlands 0–2
Australia eventually finished fourth, after a loss in the penalty shoot-out against home nation the United States.
Team Roster
 Marian Bell
 Evelyn Botfield
 Sharon Buchanan
 Loretta Dorman
 Pamela Glossop
 Penny Gray
 Tricia Heberle
 Lorraine Hillas
 Robyn Holmes
 Kym Ireland
 Robyn Fernley (captain)
 Colleen Pearce
 Sandra Pisani
 Julene Sunderland
 Liane Tooth
 Susan Watkins
Head Coach: Brian Glencross

Judo

Modern pentathlon

Three male pentathletes represented Australia in 1984.

Individual
 Alex Watson
 Matthew Spies
 Daniel Esposito

Team
 Alex Watson
 Matthew Spies
 Daniel Esposito

Rhythmic gymnastics

Rowing

Sailing

Shooting

Swimming

Men's Competition
Men's 100 m Freestyle
Michael Delany
 Qualifying heat 4 – 51.22 (1st)
 Final b – DNS
Mark Stockwell
 Qualifying heat 6 – 50.27 (1st)
 Final – 50.24 (→  Silver Medal)

Men's 200 m Freestyle
Peter Dale
 Qualifying heat 1 – 1:51.42 (1st)
 Final – 1:53.84 (8th)
Justin Lemberg
 Qualifying heat 5 – 1:52.73 (4th, did not advance)

Men's 400 m Freestyle
Justin Lemberg
 Qualifying heat 2 – 3:53.89 (1st)
 Final – 3:51.79 (→  Bronze Medal)
Ron McKeon
 Qualifying heat 4 – 3:55.06 (4th)
 Final – 3:55.48 (8th)

Men's 1.500 m Freestyle
Justin Lemberg
 Qualifying heat 1 – 15:29.74 (1st, did not advance)
Wayne Shillington
 Qualifying heat 3 – 15:25.67 (3rd)
 Final – 15:38.18 (8th)

Men's 100 m Butterfly
Glenn Buchanan
 Qualifying heat 1 – 54.86 (1st)
 Final – 53.85 (→  Bronze Medal)
Mark Stockwell
 Qualifying heat 7 – 55.70 (3rd)
 Final b – DNS

Men's 200 m Butterfly
Jon Sieben
 Qualifying heat 4 – 1:58.63 (2nd)
 Final – 1:57.04 (→  Gold Medal)

Men's 100 m Breaststroke
Peter Evans
 Qualifying heat 2 – 1:02.87 (1st)
 Final – 1:02.97 (→  Bronze Medal)
Brett Stocks
 Qualifying heat 5 – 1:03.46 (1st)
 Final – 1:03.49 (6th)

Men's 200 m Breaststroke
Glenn Beringen
 Qualifying heat 6 – 2:17.29 (1st)
 Final – 2:15.79 (→  Silver Medal)
Peter Evans
 Qualifying heat 1 – 2:21.21 (2nd)
 Final b – DNS

Men's 100 m Backstroke
Mark Kerry
 Qualifying heat 2 – 57.15 (1st)
 Final – 57.18 (5th)
David Orbell
 Qualifying heat 1 – 58.35 (1st)
 Final b – 58.05 (1st)

Men's 200 m Backstroke
David Orbell
 Qualifying heat 3 – 2:04.00 (1st)
 Final – 2:04.61 (8th)
Kim Terrell
 Qualifying heat 5 – 2:06.56 (3rd, did not advance)

Men's 200 m Individual Medley
Rob Woodhouse
 Qualifying heat 1 – 2:06.45 (2nd)
 Final b – 2:04.85 (1st)
Glenn Beringen
 Qualifying heat 2 – 2:08.85 (4th, did not advance)

Men's 400 m Individual Medley
Rob Woodhouse
 Qualifying heat 3 – 4:24.85 (3rd)
 Final – 4:20.50 (→  Bronze Medal)

Men's 4 × 100 m Freestyle Relay 
Neil Brooks, Michael Delany, Greg Fasala, and Mark Stockwell
 Qualifying heat 3 – 3:19.94 (1st)
 Final – 3:19.68 (→  Silver Medal)

Men's 4 × 200 m Freestyle Relay 
Graeme Brewer, Peter Dale, Justin Lemberg, and Ron McKeon
 Qualifying heat 2 – 7:26.93 (2nd)
 Final – 7:25.63 (4th)

Men's 4 × 100 m Medley Relay
Thomas Stachewicz, Glenn Buchanan, Peter Evans, Mark Kerry, and Mark Stockwell
 Qualifying heat 3 – 3:43.93 (1st)
 Final – 3.43.25 (→  Bronze Medal)

Women's Competition
Women's 50 m Freestyle
Lisa Curry
 Qualifying heat 6 – 26.07 (11th)
 Final b – 25.87 (1st)

Women's 100 m Freestyle
Susie Ford
 Qualifying heat 4 – 57.76 (1st, did not advance)
Angela Harris
 Qualifying heat 6 – 57.30 (2nd)
 Final – 58.09 (8th)
Michelle Pearson
 Qualifying heat 4 – 56.75 (1st)
 Final – 56.83 (5th)

Women's 200 m Freestyle
Michelle Pearson
 Qualifying heat 3 – 2:01.49 (2nd)
 Final – 1:59.79 (4th)
Susie Ford
 Qualifying heat 4 – 2:04.82 (8th, did not advance)
Anna McVann
 Qualifying heat 3 – 2:03.14 (3rd)
 Final – 2:02.87 (8th)

Women's 400 m Freestyle
Susie Ford
 Qualifying heat 3 – 4:20.68 (4th)
 Final b – 4:15.46 (1st)
Anna McVann
 Qualifying heat 3 – 4:15.21 (2nd)
 Final – 4:13.95 (5th)

Women's 800 m Freestyle
Susie Ford
 Qualifying heat 3 – 8:56.40 (6th, did not advance)
Anna McVann
 Qualifying heat 2 – 8:35.19 (2nd)
 Final – 8:37.94 (4th)

Women's 100 m Butterfly
Janet Blood
 Qualifying heat 4 – 1:01.97 (2nd)
 Final – 1:01.78 (5th)
Lisa Curry
 Qualifying 7 – 1:01.07 (9th)
 Final b – 1:01.61 (5th)

Women's 200 m Butterfly
Karen Higgison
 Qualifying heat 3 – 2:11.81 (1st)
 Final – 2:10.56 (→  Silver Medal)
Janet Blood
 Qualifying heat 2 – 2:13.74 (2nd)
 Swim-off with Conny van Bentum (NED) – 2:15.54 (2nd)
 Final b – DNS

Women's 100 m Breaststroke
Dimity Douglas
 Qualifying heat 2 – 1:12.18 (3rd)
 Final b – 1:12:00 (3rd)
Sharon Kellett
 Qualifying heat 3 – 1:13.43 (4th, did not advance)

Women's 200 m Breaststroke
Dimity Douglas
 Qualifying heat 3 – 2:36.47 (5th)
 Final b – 2:39.33 (8th)
Sharon Kellett
 Qualifying heat 2 – 2:33.23 (1st)
 Final – 2:33.80 (5th)

Women's 100 m Backstroke
Georgina Parkes
 Qualifying heat 3 – 1:04.90 (2nd)
 Final b – 1:04.52 (2nd)
Audrey Youl
 Qualifying heat 1 – 1:04.94 (3rd)
 Final b – 1:04.15 (1st)

Women's 200 m Backstroke
Georgina Parkes
 Qualifying heat 1 – 2:18.49 (1st)
 Final – 2:14.87 (4th)
Audrey Youl
 Qualifying heat 3 – 2:20.12 (4th)
 Final b – 2:21.36 (8th)

Women's 200 m Individual Medley
Michelle Pearson
 Qualifying heat 3 – 2:17.46 (2nd)
 Final – 2:15.92 (→  Bronze Medal)

Women's 400 m Individual Medley
Suzanne Dill-Macky
 Qualifying heat 3 – 4:54.13 (2nd)
 Final – 4:44.30 (→  Silver Medal)
Karen Higgison
 Qualifying heat 3 – 5:54.28 (4th)
 Final b – 4:53.37 (11th)

Women's 4 × 100 m Freestyle Relay
Lisa Curry, Angela Harris, Janet Blood, Michelle Pearson
 Qualifying heat 1 – 3:49.61 (2nd)
Michelle Pearson, Angela Harris, Anna McVann, Lisa Curry
 Final – 3:47.79 (4th)

Women's 4 × 100 m Medley Relay
Audrey Youl, Dimity Douglas, Lisa Curry, and Angela Harris
 Qualifying heat 2 – DSQ

Synchronized swimming

Water polo

Men's team competition
Preliminary round (Group C)
 Lost to West Germany (6–10)
 Drew with Italy (8–8)
 Defeated Japan (15–2)
Final Round (Group D)
 Lost to Yugoslavia (6–9)
 Lost to United States (7–12)
 Defeated Netherlands (8–7)
 Drew with Spain (10–10) → 5th place
 Team Roster
 Michael Turner
 Richard Pengelley
 Robert Bryant
 Peter Montgomery
 Russell Sherwell
 Andrew Kerr
 Raymond Mayers
 Charles Turner
 Martin Callaghan
 Christopher Wybrow
 Russell Basser
 Julian Muspratt
 Glenn Townsend
Head coach: Tom Hoad

Weightlifting

Wrestling

See also
Australia at the 1982 Commonwealth Games
Australia at the 1986 Commonwealth Games

References

External links
Australian Olympic Committee

Nations at the 1984 Summer Olympics
1984
Olympics